The twelfth season of Family Guy aired on Fox from September 29, 2013, to May 18, 2014.

The series follows the Griffin family, a dysfunctional family consisting of father Peter, mother Lois, daughter Meg, son Chris, baby Stewie, and the family dog Brian, who reside in their hometown of Quahog.

During this season, Peter gets a vestigial twin ("Vestigial Peter"); the Griffins travel to Italy ("Boopa-dee Bappa-dee"); Quagmire and Peter form a folk band ("Into Harmony's Way"); and, as confirmed by series creator Seth MacFarlane, Cleveland moves back to Quahog along with his family, since The Cleveland Show was cancelled ("He's Bla-ack!"). Also, as mentioned by Steve Callaghan in the 2013 Comic-con Panel, a member of the Griffin family was killed off in a special episode. After much speculation, that member was Brian, after being hit by a car in the episode "Life of Brian". This elicited strongly negative reactions from fans of the show, and a petition demanding Brian to be resurrected garnered over 100,000 signatures. His death turned out to be only temporary as in the episode "Christmas Guy", Stewie goes back in time and saves him, effectively changing the future so that he never dies. 

Guest stars for the season include Conan O'Brien, Lea Thompson, Jeff Daniels, Michelle Dockery, Tony Sirico, Yvette Nicole Brown, Gary Cole, Lauren Bacall, Liam Neeson, Bryan Cranston, Adam Levine, and Ariana Grande.

This is the last season to be secondarily composed by Ron Jones, leaving Walter Murphy in charge of the musical score for the rest of the series.

Marketing
At San Diego Comic Con 2013, It was revealed by showrunner Steve Callaghan that one member of the Griffin Family would be killed off. Though many assumed to be Meg Griffin, the cast remained silent. Which would later be revealed to be Brian Griffin. In addition, a preview was released. It was also revealed that a crossover episode with The Simpsons was in the works, which released in September 2014, titled The Simpsons Guy.

Episodes

Reception

References

 
Family Guy seasons
2013 American television seasons
2014 American television seasons